The 2022 Hillingdon London Borough Council election took place on 5 May 2022. All 53 members of Hillingdon London Borough Council were elected. The elections took place alongside local elections in the other London boroughs and elections to local authorities across the United Kingdom.

In the previous election in 2018, the Conservative Party maintained its control of the council, winning 44 out of the 65 seats with the Labour Party as the council opposition with the remaining 21 seats. The 2022 election took place under new election boundaries, which reduced the number of councillors to 53. The Conservatives maintained control despite losing 4 seats to the Labour Party.

Background

History 

The thirty-two London boroughs were established in 1965 by the London Government Act 1963. They are the principal authorities in Greater London and have responsibilities including education, housing, planning, highways, social services, libraries, recreation, waste, environmental health and revenue collection. Some of the powers are shared with the Greater London Authority, which also manages passenger transport, police, and fire.

Hillingdon has been under Conservative control, Labour control and no overall control since its establishment. The Conservatives have held control since the 2006 election, when they won 45 seats with 47.0% of the vote to Labour's 18 seats on 24.4% of the vote and the Liberal Democrats' 2 seats with 20.5% of the vote. The Liberal Democrats lost their representation on the council in 2010 and did not regain it in the subsequent council elections in 2014 or 2018. In the most recent election in 2018, the Conservatives won 44 seats with 54.2% of the vote while Labour won 21 seats with 38.5% of the vote. Among the other parties, the Green Party performed best with 4.9% of the vote across the borough. The incumbent council leader was reselected after the 2018 election, Ray Puddifoot, who had led the Conservative group since 2000.

Council term 

A Conservative councillor for Hillingdon East, Pat Jackson, resigned in early 2020. A by-election to replace her was held on 27 February 2020, which was held for the Conservatives by Colleen Sullivan with a large swing from Labour. A Conservative councillor for Charville ward, Neil Fyfe, died in November 2020. He had represented the ward since 2010. Due to the COVID-19 pandemic, the by-election to fill his seat wasn't held until 6 May 2021 alongside the 2021 London mayoral election and London Assembly election. The seat was held for the Conservatives by Darran Davies, with the Labour candidate coming second. Puddifoot stood down as council leader in January, and was replaced by the Conservative councillor and former Metropolitan Police commander Ian Edwards.

Along with most London boroughs, Hillingdon will be electing councillors under new ward boundaries in 2022. Following local consultation, the Local Government Boundary Commission for England produced new boundaries reducing the number of councillors from 65 to 53 across twelve three-councillor wards with eight two-seat wards and one single-seat ward.

Electoral process 
Hillingdon, as with all other London borough councils, elects all of its councillors at once every four years, with the previous election having taken place in 2018. The election took place by multi-member first-past-the-post voting, with each ward being represented by two or three councillors. Electors had as many votes as there are councillors to be elected in their ward, with the top two or three being elected.

All registered electors (British, Irish, Commonwealth and European Union citizens) living in London aged 18 or over were entitled to vote in the election. People who live at two addresses in different councils, such as university students with different term-time and holiday addresses, were entitled to be registered for and vote in elections in both local authorities. Voting in-person at polling stations will take place from 7:00 to 22:00 on election day, and voters were able to apply for postal votes or proxy votes in advance of the election.

Campaign 
The Conservative peer Robert Hayward listed Hillingdon as one of four councils his party risked losing control of in London following the partygate scandal. Labour had been expected to make gains in the borough in the 2018 election, but had fallen back. The borough includes the prime minister Boris Johnson's constituency, Uxbridge and South Ruislip, which a January poll suggested he would be at risk of losing in the event of a general election.

Previous council composition

Results summary

Ward results 
Statements of persons nominated were published on 6 April

Belmore

Charville

Colham and Cowley

Eastcote

Harefield Village

Hayes Town

Heathrow Villages

Hillingdon East

Hillingdon West

Ickenham and South Harefield

Northwood

Northwood Hills

Pinkwell

Ruislip

Ruislip Manor

South Ruislip

Uxbridge

West Drayton

Wood End

Yeading

Yiewsley

References 

Council elections in the London Borough of Hillingdon
Hillingdon